In Dementia is the seventh studio album by the American heavy metal band Chastain, released in 1997 through Leviathan Records. The album was re-issuued in Europe by Massacre Records.

Track listing
All songs by David T. Chastain and Kate French

"Human Sacrifice" – 6:09
"Blackening" - 4:47
"Seven" - 6:28
"Sick Puppy" - 4:48
"Tongue" - 6:13
"In Dementia" - 5:44
"House of Stone" - 5:43
"Conformity" - 6:35
"Desperately" - 8:44

Personnel

Band members
Kate French - lead and backing vocals, engineer
David T. Chastain - electric and acoustic guitars, keyboards, backing vocals, producer, engineer 
Kevin Kekes - bass guitar
Dennis Lesh - drums

Production
Ryan Adkins, David Shew - engineers

References

1997 albums
Chastain (band) albums
Massacre Records albums